University of Economics Ho Chi Minh City (UEH University) is a multidisciplinary university which was established in 1976 in Ho Chi Minh City, Vietnam. It is one of the National Key Universities of Vietnam and is a member of The Best 1,000 Business Schools in the World. From its inception until now, the school has been a renowned center of scientific research in Vietnam, providing undergraduate and postgraduate education for students from the country and neighboring Laos and Cambodia. CYM Group, a student academic club of the University of Economics Ho Chi Minh City is the first student group in Vietnam to set a Guinness World Record. Graduates of the university since its establishment include:

200,000 Bachelors
5,355 Masters
439 Doctorates

The university now provides graduate and postgraduate education (master's, doctoral programs) to over 50,000 students/year.
University of Economics Ho Chi Minh City celebrated its 45th anniversary on October 27, 2021, with the theme “UEH Toward Future University”.

History
In 1996, the Prime Minister of Vietnam issued Decision No 2819/GD-ĐT to merge Hochiminh City University of Economics, the University of Finance - Accounting and Ho Chi Minh City University's Faculty of Economics into the University of Economics as a member of Vietnam National University, Ho Chi Minh City (VNU-HCM).

In 2000, the Prime Minister signed the structural transform decision to detach the University of Economics from VNU-HCM into the University of Economics Ho Chi Minh City (UEH) under the administration of the Ministry of Education and Training, Vietnam (MoET).

Staff 
As in 2021, the school has nearly 800 lecturers, the students/teachers rate on a reach 22:1; Include 25 Professors, 53 Associate Professors, 07 People's Teachers, 35 Excellent Teachers, 255 Ph.D., 371 Masters, and 179 international experts.

Current students
UEH University is training nearly 52,000 students and trainees under the system grades: regular college or university degree two formal, non-formal college or university degree two non-formal and complete knowledge college, high school, graduate students, which is the largest university system of government.

Achievements and awards

Achievements
 Eduniversal: Top 1,000 Best Business Schools and Top 100 Best MBA program in the world
 QS World University Rankings: Top 551+ Best Universities in Asia
 SCImago Institutions Rankings: #376 Best Universities in Asia in Research Performance, Innovation, and Societal Impact
 U-Multirank: Top 25 Performing Universities in income from continuous professional development (since 2016)
 Webometrics Ranking of World Universities: Top 11 Best Universities in Vietnam

Awards
President of Vietnam awarded for UEH:
 Hero of Labor (Vietnam) title in 2006
 Independence Order in 2021
 3 Labor Order in 1986, 1991 and 1996
 3 Labor Order for UEH's labor union in 1996, 2001 and 2006
 2 Labor Order for UEH's Ho Chi Minh Communist Youth Union in 1997 and 2002
 Labor Order for UEH's Students Union in 2006
 Labor Order for UEH's achievement gratitude and charitable social work in 2000.

Schools and institutes

College of Business
 Faculty of Finance
 Faculty of Accounting
 Faculty of Management
 Faculty of International Business and Marketing
 Faculty of Banking
 Faculty of Tourism
 Institute of Human Resources Development

College of Economics, Law, and Government
 Faculty of Economics
 Faculty of Government
 Faculty of Law
 Faculty of Public Finance
 Institute of Public Policy 
 Institute of Economic Development Research

College of Technology and Design
 Faculty of Economic Mathematics and Statistics
 Faculty of Business Information Technology
 Institute of Smart City and Management
 Institute of Applied Mathematics
 Institute of Intelligent & Interactive Technology

UEH Vinh Long Campus
 Faculty of Accounting 
 Faculty of Finance and Banking 
 Faculty of Management
 Faculty of Information Technology
 Mekong Center of International Education

Other faculties and institutes
 Faculty of Political Studies
 Faculty of Foreign Languages of Economics
 International Language and Country Studies Institute
 Center for Excellence in Management Development
 Journal of Economic Development
 International School of Business (Vietnam)

International cooperation
Students will study half-time at UEH University and half-time abroad, and receive a degree from a foreign partner.
 CFVG - France Vietnamese Centre For Management Education: MBA, Master's degree in Economics, Banking - Finance, and Marketing
 Vietnam – The Netherlands Program Erasmus University Rotterdam; Master's degree in Applied Economics (MAE), Master Double Degree Programme (DDP) and Joint Doctorate Programme (JDP)
 Vietnam – The New Zealand Program (Victoria University of Wellington): Bachelor's degree in Commerce and Administration 
 UEH University - Western Sydney University Program: Master's degree in Business Administration and Commerce, Doctoral program in Economics

See also

Fulbright economics teaching program (University of Economics)
List of universities in Vietnam
List of colleges in Ho Chi Minh City

References

External links

Official Website

Universities in Ho Chi Minh City